Shweta Tripathi Sharma (born 6 July 1985) is an Indian actress popularly known for the character of Golu Gupta in Mirzapur. She began her film career as a production assistant and associate director and gained wider recognition and accolades for her acting performances in the Hindi film industry and web series. Notable films include Masaan (2015) and Haraamkhor (2017).

Early life 
Tripathi was born on 6 July 1985 in New Delhi. Her father works for the Indian Administrative Service and her mother is a retired teacher. The family moved a lot due to her father's job. Tripathi spent her childhood in Andaman and Nicobar Islands and Mumbai, Maharashtra. She describes her time in Andaman as her happiest: "That’s when I discovered how much I like travelling and being outdoors. Every weekend used to be a picnic on a new island, and it was an enriching experience".

Tripathi moved back to New Delhi to pursue secondary education and attended the Delhi Public School, RK Puram. She then studied at National Institute of Fashion Technology and graduated with a degree in Fashion Communication.

Personal life 
Tripathi married actor and rapper Chaitanya Sharma on 29 June 2018 in Goa.

Career
Tripathi is mostly known for her role in Masaan, where she played Actor Vicky Kaushal's girlfriend. She also played the role of Zenia Khan, a tomboyish character, in the Disney India sitcom Kya Mast Hai Life. She has also appeared in advertisements for brands such as Tata Sky, McDonald's, and Vodafone. She also appears in ads for Tata Sky download, McDonald's, Tanishq, and most recently Tata Tea. She was also a photo editor for the women's magazine, Femina. Before her work on the sitcom Kya Mast Hai Life, she worked at Pixion trailer house, a post-production house in Mumbai, and also ran a theater company called All My Tea Productions.

She was a part of The Trip on Bindass and made her Tamil debut with Mehandi Circus directed by Saravana Rajendran. She was also a part of the movie Zoo, India’s first feature-length movie shot entirely on an iPhone. Shweta later appeared in the web series Mirzapur as Golu Gupta in which her masturbation scene was praised for its frank portrayal of women's sexuality. Tripathi’s latest film Gone Kesh is her most ambitious wherein she plays an adolescent dancer who develops alopecia and loses her hair and her self-esteem.

She is also admired for her role in TVF Tripling in the 3rd episode of season 2 as Begum Zainab, who is in love with the elderly Nawab. In season 2 of Laakhon Mein Ek, she played the lead role of Dr. Shreya. She will next be seen in Disney+ Hotstar's web series Escaype Live.

Filmography

Films

Web series

References

External links

 
 

Living people
1985 births
Actresses from New Delhi
Indian film actresses
Indian television actresses
Indian web series actresses
Actresses in Hindi cinema
Actresses in Hindi television
Zee Cine Awards winners
21st-century Indian actresses